Abu Mohammed al-Qasim al-Sijilmasi (died 1304) was an important literary scholar from Morocco and the author of Al-Manza al-badi fi tagnis asalib al-badi (The Striking Course in Categorising the Forms of the Rhetorical Figures). In this book of literary theory he classifies the figures of speech under ten main categories and various sub-categories.

References

Year of birth unknown
1304 deaths
Moroccan writers
Moroccan literary critics
People from Sijilmasa
13th-century Moroccan people
14th-century Moroccan people